The Laferla Cross is an early 20th-century religious landmark on the outskirts of Siggiewi, in Malta. It is situated on a hill close to the Chapel of the Annunciation and the Cemetery of Saint Theodore.

History
The original Laferla Cross was built under the supervision of Ġanni Mercieca in 1903.  It was named after Fr. Paul Laferla, who proposed its construction as a memorial of the Holy Year. A year after its construction, the cross was blessed by the Archbishop and an art painting of Our Lady of Sorrows was placed within the shrine. The cross was restored on number of times generally due to damage and degradation but it has at times collapsed.
  The 1903 Laferla Cross was replaced with a 1963 Italian replica reinforced in bronze and iron. Threatened by erosion and in danger of collapse the cross was restored by locals craftsmen in 1984. The pathway leading to the Cross was included as part of the EU’s Rural Development Programme for Malta in 2014 to rehabilitate the environment around the landmark by paving of the area surrounding the cross and the pathway behind it to improve accessibility and attract more visitors.

Cultural tradition
The Laferla Cross is closely linked to Catholic cultural traditions and constitutes a yearly meeting point for Maltese pilgrims during the night on Maundy Thursday and Good Friday. Since 1994, the steep hill leading to the Cross has been illuminated  with torches and candlelight during this celebration, forming a pathway originating from statues of Jesus symbolizing his final hours before crucifixion. The pilgrimage is taken in a spirit of worship and silence, and some devout Catholics choose to walk the steep hill on bare feet.

Details
The Laferla Cross stands over a limestone shrine hosting a small rudimentary altar, and three paintings of varying sizes, the largest of which representing a solemn Virgin. A crucifix hangs on the interior's central wall. On the outside, various Latin inscriptions referencing the year of construction and dedications can be read on each side of the monument.

Gallery

References

Siġġiewi
Roman Catholic shrines in Malta
Buildings and structures completed in 1903
Limestone buildings in Malta